Polynesian Adventure Tours, Inc. (co-branded as Gray Line Hawaii, also known as PolyAd) is a tour and transportation company in Hawaii. PolyAd was founded in 1977 by Bob George and his partner Don Brown who started the company as an operator of van sightseeing tours in Waikiki. PolyAd specializes in personalized tours that utilize drivers as narrators and guides. In 2017 PolyAd was acquired by California-based Transportation Charter Services (TCS). Polynesian Adventure Tours maintains offices on Oahu, Maui, Kauai, The Big Island and provides tours to Hawaiian landmarks.

Polynesian Adventure Tours is also the parent company of the Luau Kalamaku, a theatrical hula show and dinner experience held at Kilohana Plantation in Lihue, Kauai.

History
Polynesian Adventure Tours was founded in 1977 by Bob George and Don Brown, with a small fleet of vans. The founders sold the company in 1986, to Atak Management Corporation, owned by Japanese-American businessman, Shig Katayama. Don Brown left the company and Bob George remained as Director of Sales. The company's fleet was expanded with the addition of motorcoaches and minibuses on Oahu, and bases operating sightseeing vans on the islands of Hawaii, Maui and Kauai.

In August 1996, the US Bankruptcy Court for the District of Hawaii approved the sale of Gray Line Hawaii, Ltd.'s PUC-issued authority "to provide services as a common carrier by motor vehicle in the over-twenty-five passenger classifications on the islands of Hawaii, Maui, and Kauai" to Polynesian Adventure Tours, Inc. This allowed Polyad to further expand its motorcoach and minibus fleet to the islands outside of Oahu.

In October 2017, Poly Ad was acquired by Orange County, California based Transportation Charter Services (TCS) from Norwegian Cruise Lines.  Shortly thereafter, the company began a comprehensive fleet modernization program, including the acquisition of new, luxury mini-coaches for use in a new category of premium tours

Awards
Polynesian Adventure Tours – Gray Line Hawaii has been recognized as Metro Magazine's 10 Innovative Motorcoach Operators in 2006 and is consistently in the Top 50 Motorcoach Operators list. The company was also the recipient of Gray Line Worldwide's Market Development Award in 2008.

References

External links
Polynesian Adventure Tours Official Website
Luau Kalamaku Official Website

Tourism in Hawaii
Bus transportation in Hawaii
Transport companies established in 1977
Travel and holiday companies of the United States
Companies based in Honolulu
Norwegian Cruise Line
1977 establishments in Hawaii